USS LCI(L)-760 was an LCI-351-class Landing Craft Infantry (Large), laid down and launched on dates unknown.  Commissioned on 26 May 1944 as USS LCI(L)-760, reclassified LCI(G)-760 (Gunboat) on 31 December 1944, and again reclassified as LCI(M)-760 (Mortar) on 30 April 1945.

LCI(M)-760 was assigned to the Pacific and took part in two combat actions, the Iwo Jima landings (as LCI(G)-760) from 19 to 26 February 1945 and the Okinawa landings from 26 March 1945 to 14 June 1945.  According to renowned Naval historian, Samuel Eliot Morison, she was lightly damaged by a near miss from a coastal battery, while configured as LCI(M), at Iwo Jima, wounding two, on 25 February 1945.

After Victory over Japan Day, LCI(M)-760 performed occupation duty in Japan from 18 September 1945 to 2 April 1946.  LCI(M)-760 was based out of the port of Nagasaki, Japan for some if not all of this time.  Duties included transportation of U.S. Marines to outlying islands to take surrender of Japanese garrisons, and other fleet duties.

LCI(M)-760 was decommissioned, date unknown and was struck from the Naval Vessel Register. Sold on 20 January 1947, LCI(M)-760s fate is not known.

LCI(G)-760 received one battle star for World War II service. LCI(M)-760 received one battle star for World War II service.

References
Citations

Webpages
 

Books and articles
  Landing Craft Infantry Vol. II. © 1995, Turner Publishing Company Paducah, Kentucky
 
"Personal Interview of Robert W. Wilson, Sr." U.S.N.R. Gunner's Mate 2nd Class, 1944 - 1946 Served aboard LCI(M)-760 During the Assault and occupation of Okinawa Gunto, 26 March to 14 June 1945.

LCI(L)-351-class large infantry landing craft
World War II amphibious warfare vessels of the United States
1944 ships